The fourth election to the Greater London Council was held on 12 April 1973. Labour won a large majority of 58 seats to 32 for the Conservatives; the Liberals also won their first two seats on the council.

Electoral arrangements
As there had been a boundary commission report with new Parliamentary constituencies which coincided with the border of Greater London, the electoral system was changed (as had always been intended) so that the GLC was elected from single member electoral divisions which were identical with the Parliamentary constituencies.

Results
With an electorate of 5,313,470, there was a turnout of 36.8%. In addition to the 92 councillors, there were sixteen Aldermen who divided 9 Labour and 6 Conservative, so that Labour actually had 67 seats to 38 for the Conservatives following the election.

Among those who were first elected to the GLC in 1973 were Ken Livingstone (Labour, Lambeth, Norwood), later to lead it, Andrew McIntosh (Labour, Haringey, Tottenham) who was his brief moderate rival for the Labour leadership, and Serge Lourie (Labour, Havering Hornchurch), who became a founder member of the SDP and Leader of the LB Richmond upon Thames in 2001.

By-elections 1973–1977
The first by-election of the term was caused by the court voiding the election in Croydon North East (see Morgan v Simpson). On 5 September 1974 the former Conservative member Billie Morgan regained the seat she had narrowly lost. Labour retained seats in Greenwich on 24 October 1974 and Dagenham on 30 January 1975 caused by the deaths of sitting councillors. The Conservatives kept their seat in Finchley on 15 May 1975 caused by the resignation of Roland Freeman and St. Marylebone on 8 April 1976 caused by the resignation of former GLC leader Desmond Plummer.

References

1973
1973 English local elections
1973 in London
April 1973 events in the United Kingdom